Paul Moder (1 October 1896, Neheim – 8 February 1942) was a German NSDAP politician, a captain in the  Freikorps and the SS and Police Leader in Warsaw from November 1939 to July 1941. Transferred to the Waffen SS, he served with the SS-Totenkopf Division and died in action on the eastern front.

References

1896 births
1942 deaths
People from Arnsberg
20th-century Freikorps personnel
Sturmabteilung personnel
Members of the Reichstag of the Weimar Republic
Members of the Reichstag of Nazi Germany
SS and Police Leaders
People from the Province of Westphalia
SS-Gruppenführer
Waffen-SS personnel killed in action
Military personnel from North Rhine-Westphalia